The Einasleigh River Bridge is a road bridge over the Einasleigh River on the Gulf Developmental Road, in the Far North Queensland, Australia, located  east of Georgetown and  west of Mount Surprise. The bridge is part of the only sealed (asphalt) road linking Cairns and Normanton in the Gulf Savannah region.

The new high set bridge was constructed to flood-proof the Gulf Country. It replaced an existing low level bridge which was designed for inundation. The old bridge was flooded in every wet season. In 2009 it was under water for 40 days after the biggest flood on record. During flooding of the old Einasleigh River Bridge, most communities across the Gulf Shires were inaccessible by road and the emergency supplies had to be provided by helicopter.

The bridge was built by the Etheridge Shire Council and was funded through the Australian Government's Regional and Local Community Infrastructure Program. It was opened on 20 January 2011 by Simon Crean, the Minister for Regional Australia, Regional Development and Local Government.

References

External links
 Einasleigh River Bridge Infrastructure Development Presentation

Road bridges in Queensland
Bridges completed in 2011
Buildings and structures in Far North Queensland
Beam bridges
2011 establishments in Australia
Concrete bridges in Australia
Viaducts in Australia